The Clausura 2009 Liguilla Final was a two-legged football match-up to determine the Clausura 2009 champions. The final was contested by  Club Universidad Nacional (mostly known for the acronym "UNAM") and Pachuca. The first leg was held in Estadio Olímpico Universitario in Mexico City and was won by UNAM 1–0. The second leg was held in Estadio Hidalgo of Pachuca where both teams tied 2–2 after extra time.

UNAM won the series 3–2 on aggregate, therefore the club crowned champion of the season, achieving their sixth Mexican Primera División title.

Rules 
Like other match-ups in the knockout round, the teams will play two games, one at each team's home stadium. As the highest seeded team determined at the beginning of the Liguilla, Toluca was to have home-field advantage for the second leg. If the teams remained tied after 90 minutes of play during the 2nd leg, extra time will be used, followed by a penalty shootout if necessary.

Venues

Match summary

First leg

Second leg

References

Cla
C.F. Pachuca matches
2009